Alessandro Nelli (Rome, 28 January 1842 – Russia?, after 1897) was an Italian entrepreneur. Nelli was the founder of the Fonderia Nelli (Nelli Foundry), which was the leading sculpture foundry in Rome from 1880 to 1900. He participated to national, international and universal exhibitions, winning several prizes and medals. He exported more than 100 pieces to the 1893 World's Columbian Exposition in Chicago. Nelli made artistic bronzes for several Italian and foreign artists, including several American artists.

Works 
 Odoardo Tabacchi, Monument to Arnaldo da Brescia, Brescia, Piazzale Arnaldo
 Ettore Ferrari, Monument to King Vittorio Emanuele II, Riva degli Schiavoni, Venice[5]
 William Wetmore Story, Monument to William Prescott, Boston
 William Wetmore Story, Monument John Marshall, US Supreme Court, Washington D.C.
 Pius Welonsky, Gladiator, National Museum, Warsaw
 Franklin Simmons, Monument to John Logan, Logan Circle, Washington, D.C., 1892-1901
 , Monument to Giuseppe Garibaldi, Brescia
 Reliquary of St Adamo Abate, Guglionesi
 Edward Müller, The Torch, Accademia di San Luca, Rome[6]
 Ernesto Biondi, Monument to Manuel Montt and Antonio Varas, Santiago, Chile, 1900-1904
 Ernesto Biondi, Saturnalia, Galleria Nazionale d'Arte Moderna, Rome
 Giulio Tadolini, Equestrian monument to King Vittorio Emanuele II, 1890, Perugia
 Giulio Tadolini, Monument to Dalmacio Vélez Sársfield, 1893, Córdoba, Argentina
 Richard Henry Park, Monument to Vice President Thomas A. Hendricks, 1890, Indiana State House, Indianapolis, US
 Randolph Rogers, The last arrow, 1879-1880, Metropolitan Museum of Art, New York City
 Carlo Filippo Chiaffarino, Monument to Count Canevaro, Zoagli, Genoa
 Pietro Costa, Monument to King Victor Emmanuel II, 1881-1889, Turin
 Ettore Ferrari, Monument to King Victor Emmanuel II, c. 1880, Venice
 Ettore Ferrari, Monument to the poet Ovidius, 1887, Constanța, Romania
 Giulio Monteverde, Monument to King Victor Emmanuel II, 1888, Bologna
 Giulio Monteverde, Monument to King Victor Emmanuel II, 1889, Ferrara
 Giovanni Anderlini, Monument to Simón Bolívar, 1889, Guayaquil
 Eugenio Maccagnani, Monument to Giuseppe Garibaldi, 1889, Brescia
 Vincenzo Ragusa, Monument to Giuseppe Garibaldi, 1892, Palermo
 Augusto Rivalta, Monument to King Victor Emmanuel, 1893, Livorno
 Cesare Zocchi, Monument to Dante Alighieri, 1896, Trento
 Giovanni Ciniselli, Monument to marquiss Bernardo de Sá da Bandeira, 1884, Lisbon
 Felipe Moratilla, Monument to general José Prudencio Padilla, Riohacha
 Manuel Oms Canet, Monument to queen Isabella of Castilla, 1883, Madrid
 Eduardo Barrón González, Viriatus, 1883, Zamora
 Prosper d’Épinay, Paul et Virginie, Curepipe

References

Additional sources
Angelo de Gubernatis, Dizionario di artisti italiani viventi, Firenze, 1906, p. 235.
Thieme-Becker, Allgemeinesküntlerlexikon, p. 25, p. 385
E. Colle, A. Griseri, R. Valeriani, Bronzi decorativi in Italia: bronzisti e fonditori italiani dal Seicento all'Ottocento, Milano, Electa, 2001, pp. 42, 320-323, 386
P. Coen, Il recupero del Rinascimento. Arte, politica e mercato nei primi anni di Roma capitale (1870-1911), Silvana Editoriale, Cinisello Balsamo, 2020, pp. 177–187 

Italian businesspeople
1842 births
Year of death missing